WCPL-LP (95.5 FM) is a radio station broadcasting a religious radio format. Licensed in Merritt Island, Florida, United States, the station serves the Melbourne, Florida, area.  The station is currently owned by First Baptist Church of Merritt Island.  As of October, 2011, Mr. David Crawford is the station manager.

References

External links
First Baptist Church of Merritt Island website
 

CPL-LP
CPL-LP
Baptist Christianity in Florida
Merritt Island, Florida